Satnam Singh Kainth, was an Indian politician and founder of BSP (Kainth).

Early life
He was born to Chanan Ram at Sotran, Nawanshahr (Punjab). He did B.A. from Guru Nanak Dev University, Amritsar.

Politics 
He became MLA from Banga Assembly Constituency of Bahujan Samaj Party as well as the Leader of Opposition from 1992-97.

He formed his own faction of Bahujan Samaj Party in Punjab.

In 1998, he became Member of Parliament from Phillaur constituency in Punjab and served till mid 1999.

He again contested the Punjab Assembly elections from Adampur constituency in 2012 and in 2017 from Banga constituency but lost subsequently.

He was Vice-President of Punjab Pradesh Congress Committee and later died of brain hemorrhage on 14 January 2018.

References

1961 births
2018 deaths
Lok Sabha members from Punjab, India
India MPs 1998–1999
Leaders of the Opposition in Punjab, India
Bahujan Samaj Party politicians
Indian National Congress politicians from Punjab, India